Morton L. Schwartz (August, 1883 - January 11, 1953) was an American banker and financier who was a member of the New York Stock Exchange and a major owner and breeder of Thoroughbred racehorses.

Horse racing
Morton Schwartz owned Elsmeade Farm on Russell Cave Pike near Lexington, Kentucky. Successful horses he raced included:
 Gusto, leading money earner in the United States in 1932
 Bold Venture, 1936 Kentucky Derby and Preakness Stakes
 Enfilade, 1918 American Champion Three-Year-Old Filly

On August 21, 1935, Morton Schwartz sold all his bloodstock through a Fasig-Tipton dispersal auction held at Saratoga Springs, New York. Among the yearlings sold was a filly later named Dawn Play who would turn out to be the last Champion Schwartz bred when she was voted 1937 American Champion Three-Year-Old Filly.

Morton Schwartz was a twin to brother Charles who won England's prestigious Grand National at Aintree Racecourse in 1926 with Jack Horner.

References

1883 births
1953 deaths
American bankers
American financiers
American racehorse owners and breeders
Owners of Kentucky Derby winners
Owners of Preakness Stakes winners
Businesspeople from Kentucky
20th-century American businesspeople